Ashley Jordan Miller (born 8 September 1994) is a footballer who plays for Ramsgate.

Career
Miller made his professional debut for Gillingham against Wycombe Wanderers on 2 November 2010, at the age of 16. Shortly afterwards, he was scouted and then linked with a move to various Premier League sides, most strongly Liverpool, however a move never materialised.

Miller made his first start for Gillingham on 7 March 2012 in a home game against Barnet, and scored his first senior goal in Gillingham's 4–3 defeat to Crewe Alexandra three days later. In October 2012, Miller signed on loan for Isthmian League Ramsgate, scoring the opening goal on his debut against Leatherhead in a 2–1 win. In February 2013, he signed on loan for Isthmian League Division One South side Hythe Town and scored twice on his debut before half time.

On 4 March 2014, Miller had his contract at Gillingham cancelled. He went on trial at Championship side Brentford in June 2014. He later signed for Maidstone United. prior to a move to Hythe Town on 29 September 2014. On 12 January 2015, Miller moved to divisional rivals Folkestone Invicta

On 31 May 2017, Miller rejoined Hythe for a nominal fee, despite being offered a new contract by Folkestone.

On 9 December 2017, Miller made his Faversham Town debut in a 2–2 draw with Greenwich Borough after joining the Lilywhites from Hythe Town.

He re-joined Ramsgate in the summer of 2019, having scored 13 goals for Faversham during the 2018–19 season.

References

External links

English footballers
1994 births
Living people
Footballers from Kent
Sportspeople from Dover, Kent
Association football forwards
Gillingham F.C. players
Ramsgate F.C. players
Hythe Town F.C. players
Tonbridge Angels F.C. players
Maidstone United F.C. players
Folkestone Invicta F.C. players
English Football League players
National League (English football) players
Isthmian League players